The boys’ 1500 m competition at the 2014 Summer Youth Olympics was held on 21–24 August 2014 in Nanjing Olympic Sports Center.

Schedule

Results

Heats
First 50% athletes in Qualification round will progress to the A Final, and the remaining athletes to the B Final.

Finals

Final A

Final B

External links
 iaaf.org - Men's 1500m
 Nanjing 2014 - Athletics Official Results Book
 

Athletics at the 2014 Summer Youth Olympics